A number of governments maintain permanent research stations in the Arctic. Also known as Arctic bases, polar stations or ice stations, these bases are widely distributed across the northern polar region of Earth.

Historically few research stations have been permanent. Most of them were temporary, being abandoned after the completion of the project or owing to lack of funding to continue the research. Some of these were military or intelligence stations (listening posts) created as a result of the proximity of the U.S. and Soviet Union to each other's landmass across the polar region.

Ice stations are constructed on land or on ice that rests on land, while others are drifting ice stations built on the sea ice of the high latitudes of the Arctic Ocean.

Research stations

Drifting ice stations

In fiction
Ice Station Zebra (novel), by Alistair MacLean
Ice Station Zebra (1968 film)
Ice Station Zebra a song by Jack White on Boarding House Reach
Ice Station, by Matthew Reilly
Ice Station -- Impossible!, an episode of The Venture Bros.
Ice Station Santa, an episode of Sam & Max Beyond Time and Space

Gallery

See also
List of Arctic research programs
Research stations in Antarctica
List of northernmost settlements
Winter-over syndrome
Barneo, one-month tourist ice camp annual since 2002

References

External links

A.N. Severtsov Institute of Ecology and Evolution
Centre d'études nordiques (CEN)
Russian Arctic Weather Stations - Julie Stephenson

Arctic-related lists
Arctic
 
Arctic